Bresonik is a surname of unknown origin. Notable people with the surname include:

 Linda Bresonik